Quruqchi Rud (also Romanized as Qūrūqchī Rūd; also known as Chāy Qūrūqchī, Qūrqochī Rūd, and Qūrūqchī Rūdī) is a village in Ujan-e Gharbi Rural District, in the Central District of Bostanabad County, East Azerbaijan Province, Iran. At the 2006 census, its population was 376, in 82 families.

References 

Populated places in Bostanabad County